Apollonides of Cardia was a man of ancient Greece to whom Philip II of Macedon assigned for his private use the whole territory of the Thracian Chersonesus. Apollonides was afterwards sent by Charidemus as ambassador to Philip.

Notes

Ancient Thracian Greeks
4th-century BC Greek people
Philip II of Macedon
History of the Gallipoli Peninsula